The 2011–12 Rio Grande Valley Killer Bees season was the ninth season of the CHL franchise in Hidalgo, Texas.

Regular season

Conference standings

Roster
Updated March 10, 2012.

|}

See also
 2011–12 CHL season

References

External links

R
R